Hussam Fawzi Naji (born 3 September 1974) is an Iraqi football manager and former player who played as a forward. He was the captain of the Iraq national team.

Playing career
Hussam was a leader of the Iraqi strikeforce capable of moments of genius during a game. He scored two goals against Al-Shorta in the 2–1 win in the Iraqi Cup final in 1996.

The greatest moment in his career came when he scored one goal and set-up another against Iran at the 1996 Asian Cup and was later awarded man of the match. The goal came after Hussam had pounced on a ball from Samir Kadhim, who had sent a long ball from the Iranian defence straight into the Iranian box and to the feet of the player, the striker ferociously shot from an impossible angle from the right and scored, starting endless celebrations from the Al-Makhtoum Stadium on to the streets of Iraq.

His 2 goals for Iraq in the Pan-Arab final underlined his importance to the team after Iraq was 4–0 down with less than 20 minutes left.

He represented Iraq whilst playing his club football at Al-Zawraa. He played for in Iraq at the time when Uday Hussein was in charge of the national team. Hussam was included in the 1996 and 2000 squads for the Asian Cup.

Punishment
The Iraqi football team came into public attention when newspapers started publishing stories of how Uday Hussein was known to punish players physically for achieving poor results in matches. This was used as one of the many reasons used by Tony Blair for justifying the Iraq War.

As a result of difficulties and the resulting Iraq War Hussam was unable to play international football for a while, however with the overthrow of Saddam Hussein football started to be played again. (The Iraqi league had previously been suspended since March 2003.) Hussam captained Iraq for the first time on 13 August 2003 against Iran in the first international after this, and for the determination in a difficult time, the 2003 FIFA Presidential Award was presented to the Iraqi footballing community, whom Husam represented at the award ceremony as the National Team captain.

After the war Hussam spoke about his experiences in London, saying:

He also admitted the after the Iraqi players were relieved the past was behind them but he refused to justify the war.

International goals
Scores and results list Iraq's goal tally first, score column indicates score after each Fawzi goal.

References

External links
 

1974 births
Living people
Association football forwards
Iraqi expatriate footballers
Iraqi footballers
Iraq international footballers
1996 AFC Asian Cup players
2000 AFC Asian Cup players
Al-Zawraa SC players
dubai CSC players
Pegah Gilan players
Expatriate footballers in Iran